The following events occurred in September 1942:

September 1, 1942 (Tuesday)
The German 4th Panzer Army attacked the Soviet 64th Army in the southern suburbs of Stalingrad.
German Army Group A captured the Black Sea port of Anapa.
Shigenori Tōgō resigned as Japanese Foreign Minister. 
German submarine U-756 was depth charged and sunk in the Atlantic Ocean by the Canadian corvette Morden.

September 2, 1942 (Wednesday)
The Soviet 47th Army began nightly evacuation by sea from the Taman Peninsula.
British Commandos conducted Operation Dryad, an overnight raid on the Casquets lighthouse in the Channel Islands.
German submarine U-222 sank in the Baltic Sea off Pillau after colliding with U-626. 42 crew were lost; three survived.
German submarines U-710 and U-711 were commissioned.
Died: Tom Williams, 19, member of the Irish Republican Army (hanged for murder)

September 3, 1942 (Thursday)
German troops captured Pitomnik Airfield at Stalingrad.
Following the August 16 Basilica of Begoña incident, Francisco Franco sacked Ramón Serrano Suñer as head of the Falangists and Foreign Minister and took full control of the Spanish government. Francisco Gómez-Jordana Sousa became the new Foreign Minister.
Demonstrations and strikes were held throughout Northern Ireland and Eire the day after the execution of Tom Williams.
German submarine U-162 was depth charged and sunk northeast of Trinidad by British warships.
German submarine U-705 was depth charged and sunk in the Bay of Biscay by Armstrong Whitworth Whitley bombers.
German submarine U-638 was commissioned.
Born: 
Michael Hui, actor, comedian, scriptwriter and director, in Panyu, Guangzhou, Guangdong, China; 
Al Jardine, guitarist, singer, songwriter and member of The Beach Boys, in Lima, Ohio
Died: John Mosher, 50, American short story writer and film critic for The New Yorker (heart disease)

September 4, 1942 (Friday)
Soviet planes bombed Budapest for the first time.
The Japanese ammunition ship Kashino was torpedoed and sunk in the South China Sea by the American submarine USS Growler.
Service du travail obligatoire: The Vichy French government passed a law requiring all able-bodied men age 18 to 50 and single women 21 to 35 to be subject to do any work the government deemed necessary.
Died: Zsigmond Móricz, 63, Hungarian novelist and social realist

September 5, 1942 (Saturday)
The Battle of Alam el Halfa ended in Allied victory.
The Soviet 24th and 66th Armies counterattacked the XIV Panzer Corps at Stalingrad, but the offensive was called off after losing 30 of 120 tanks, mostly to the Luftwaffe.
German submarine U-270 was commissioned.
Born: Werner Herzog, filmmaker, in Munich, Germany

September 6, 1942 (Sunday)
The Germans captured the Russian port of Novorossiysk.
As tensions in Ireland continued to run high, two policemen were shot dead in Belfast.
Arvid and Mildred Harnack of the Red Orchestra were arrested by the Gestapo. With all its leaders now imprisoned the Red Orchestra soon collapsed.
Died: 
Albert Buck, 57, German Generalmajor (killed in action near Novorossiysk); 
Günter Steinhausen, 24, German flying ace (killed in action near El Alamein)

September 7, 1942 (Monday)
The Battle of Milne Bay ended in Australian victory.
The German 6th Army attacked Mamayev Kurgan, the dominant height overlooking Stalingrad.
Cuba signed an agreement with the United States allowing a flotilla of a dozen American-manned patrol ships to operate out of Havana under Cuban colors.
U.S. President Franklin D. Roosevelt gave a fireside chat on inflation and the progress of the war.
British Commandos executed Operation Branford, an overnight raid on the Channel Island of Burhou.
Died: Cecilia Beaux, 87, American society portraitist

September 8, 1942 (Tuesday)
Winston Churchill reviewed the course of the war in an address to the British House of Commons.
The U.S. government shut down gold mines to release labor for the war effort.
The characters of Pogo the Possum and Albert the Alligator made their first appearances in the story "Albert Takes the Cake" by Walt Kelly in Animal Comics issue #1. 
Born: Želimir Žilnik, film director, in Niš, Kingdom of Yugoslavia
Died: 
Bede Camm, 77, English Benedictine monk and martyrologist
Aleksei Gan, executed for "counter-revolutionary" activities in the Soviet Union

September 9, 1942 (Wednesday)
The first of the two Lookout Air Raids occurred in Oregon. A Japanese Yokosuka E14Y floatplane launched from a submarine dropped two incendiary bombs with the intention of starting a forest fire. The damage done was minor, however.
Adolf Hitler removed Wilhelm List from command of Army Group A and took over command himself.

September 10, 1942 (Thursday)
 German forces of the 29th Motorized Division broke through to the Volga River on the southern side of Stalingrad. The Soviet 62nd Army was hit along the frontline, with its forces defending just 2 km from the heart of the city.
The RAF dropped 100,000 bombs on Düsseldorf in less than an hour.
The Italian hospital ship Arno was torpedoed and sunk in the Mediterranean by British aircraft.
German submarine U-639 was commissioned.
Died: Walter Zellot, 21, German fighter ace (shot down over Stalingrad)

September 11, 1942 (Friday)
An Anglo-Norwegian raiding party began Operation Musketoon, an attack on the German-held Glomfjord power plant in Norway.
The Canadian corvette HMCS Charlottetown was torpedoed and sunk in the Gulf of Saint Lawrence by the German submarine U-517.
The Japanese destroyer Yayoi was bombed and sunk off Vakuta Island by U.S. and British aircraft.
Born: John Greig, footballer, in Edinburgh, Scotland
Died: Rolf Mützelburg, 29, German U-boat commander (killed in an accident while swimming at sea)

September 12, 1942 (Saturday)
The Battle of Edson's Ridge began on Guadalcanal.
The British troopship RMS Laconia was torpedoed and sunk off the coast of West Africa by the German submarine U-156. U-boats were then dispatched to the area to pick up survivors.
The destruction of the German garrison in Lenin occurred in the region of Pinsk.
German submarine U-88 was depth charged and sunk off Spitsbergen by the British destroyer Faulknor.
British Commandos began Operation Aquatint, a raid on the coast of occupied France.
German submarines U-228 and U-450 were commissioned.
Miss Texas Jo-Carroll Dennison was crowned Miss America 1942.
"(I've Got a Gal In) Kalamazoo" by Glenn Miller and His Orchestra hit #1 on the Billboard singles charts.
Born: Charles L. Grant, author, in Newark, New Jersey (d. 2006)

September 13, 1942 (Sunday)
The Wehrmacht began a massive ground assault to try to take the city of Stalingrad, marking the beginning of the house-to-house fighting that most characterized the battle.
The Allies launched Operation Agreement, a series of ground and amphibious operations carried out by British, Rhodesian and New Zealand forces against Axis-held Tobruk.
Operation Aquatint ended in British defeat.
Born: Hissène Habré, seventh President of Chad, in Faya-Largeau, Chad (d. 2021)

September 14, 1942 (Monday)
The Battle of Edson's Ridge ended in Allied victory.
Operation Agreement ended in Allied failure. The light cruiser Coventry was bombed and damaged by Junkers Ju 87 aircraft and had to be scuttled, while the destroyer Sikh was shelled and sunk off Tobruk by coastal artillery. The destroyer HMS Zulu was bombed by Macchi C.200 of the Regia Aeronautica and sank the next day.
The Canadian destroyer Ottawa of convoy ON 127 was torpedoed and sunk in the Atlantic Ocean by German submarine U-91.
Chinese forces recaptured Wuyi from the Japanese.
The New York Yankees clinched the American League pennant with an 8–3 win over the Cleveland Indians.
Born: Bernard MacLaverty, author, in Belfast, Northern Ireland
Died: E. S. Gosney, 86, American philanthropist and eugenicist

September 15, 1942 (Tuesday)
Near Guadalcanal the Japanese submarine I-19 fired one of the most effective torpedo salvos of the war, mortally damaging the American aircraft carrier USS Wasp and destroyer O'Brien as well as damaging the battleship North Carolina. The destroyer Lansdowne was dispatched to rescue 447 crew of the Wasp and then scuttled the carrier.
German submarine U-261 was depth charged and sunk west of the Shetland Islands by an Armstrong Whitworth Whitley.
British submarine Talisman went missing in the Mediterranean, possibly lost to a naval mine off Sicily.
Born: Wen Jiabao, 6th Premier of China, in Tianjin, China

September 16, 1942 (Wednesday)
German Army Group B penetrated the northwest suburbs of Stalingrad.
Laconia incident: A controversial event occurred when a USAAF B-24 Liberator attacked the U-156 while survivors rescued from the September 12 RMS Laconia sinking stood on the foredeck. The U-156 was forced to dive and abandon the survivors. Karl Dönitz shortly thereafter issued the Laconia Order, forbidding any such rescue work in the future.
The National Liberation Movement, an Albanian resistance organization, was founded in Pezë.
German submarine U-457 was sunk northeast of the North Cape by depth charges from the British destroyer Impulsive.
German submarine U-528 was commissioned. 
Born: Tadamasa Goto, yakuza boss, in Ebara, Tokyo, Japan

September 17, 1942 (Thursday)
Vidkun Quisling reintroduced the death penalty to the Norwegian criminal code.
Masayuki Tani became the new Japanese Foreign Minister.
The British submarine Talisman was lost in the Mediterranean, possibly to a naval mine off Sicily.
German submarines U-305 and U-640 was commissioned.
The British war film In Which We Serve, directed by Noël Coward and David Lean, was released in the United Kingdom.
Born: 
Des Lynam, television and radio presenter, in Ennis, Ireland; 
Lupe Ontiveros, actress, in El Paso, Texas (d. 2012)
Died: Frank H. Buck, 54, American heir, businessman and politician

September 18, 1942 (Friday)
British Commandos concluded Operation Anglo successfully.
British forces landed on the east coast of Madagascar and occupied Tamatave.
The U.S. position on Guadalcanal improved with the arrival of the 7th Marine Regiment.
The Rohwer War Relocation Center, a World War II Japanese American internment camp, opened in Desha County.
Born: 
Gabriella Ferri, singer, in Rome, Italy (d. 2004); 
Wolfgang Schäuble, politician, in Freiburg im Breisgau, Germany

September 19, 1942 (Saturday)
The RAF raided Saarbrücken and Munich but failed to do much damage.
Born: Freda Payne, soul and R&B singer and actress, in Detroit, Michigan
Died: Condé Montrose Nast, 69, American founder of the Condé Nast magazine publishing company

September 20, 1942 (Sunday)
German Army Group B captured Terek.
Allied commanders set November 8 as D-Day for Operation Torch.
Nazi authorities killed 116 people in Paris in retaliation for increasing attacks on German officers.
The British destroyer Somali was torpedoed and mortally damaged in the Greenland Sea by German submarine U-255. Somali was taken under tow by destroyer HMS Ashanti but would sink four days later.
Born: Rose Francine Rogombé, politician, in Lambaréné, French Equatorial Africa (d. 2015)

September 21, 1942 (Monday)
Operation Musketoon ended in Allied success with the destruction of the Glomfjord power plant.
German submarine U-446 struck a mine and sank near Kahlberg in the Gulf of Danzig, but would be raised and returned to service.
The Boeing B-29 Superfortress had its first test flight.
Born: Sam McDowell, baseball player, in Pittsburgh, Pennsylvania

September 22, 1942 (Tuesday)
The Germans occupied the center of Stalingrad.
German submarine U-435 attacked Allied convoy QP 14 west of Jan Mayen Island and sank four ships.
German submarine U-271 was commissioned.
Born: 
David Stern, 4th Commissioner of the National Basketball Association, in New York City (d. 2020)
Marlena Shaw, singer, in New Rochelle, New York; 
Died: Ralph Adams Cram, 78, American architect

September 23, 1942 (Wednesday)
The first Actions along the Matanikau began around the Matanikau River on Guadalcanal.
British forces occupied Antananarivo in Madagascar.
Erwin Rommel left North Africa on sick leave, handing over command of the Afrika Korps to Georg Stumme.

September 24, 1942 (Thursday)
Hitler relieved Franz Halder as Chief of Staff of the OKH and replaced him with Kurt Zeitzler.
German forces in Stalingrad broke through to the Volga River and cut the 62nd Army in two.
Japanese forces landed on Maiana in the Gilbert Islands.
The B&O railroad Ambassador train ran into the back of the Cleveland Express near Dickerson, Maryland, killing twelve passengers and two crewmen in the worst B&O accident since 1907.
German submarines U-190 and U-641 were commissioned.
Born: 
Danny, schlager singer, in Pori, Finland; 
Gerry Marsden, musician, television personality and leader of Gerry and the Pacemakers, in Toxteth, Liverpool, England (d. 2021)

September 25, 1942 (Friday)
Four British de Havilland Mosquito bombers conducted the Oslo Mosquito raid, intended to boost morale of the Norwegian people. The operation failed as the Mosquito bombs failed to destroy the Gestapo HQ but caused 80 civilian casualties and one bomber was lost.
The Oslo Mosquito raid against Gestapo HQ was scheduled to coincide with a rally of Norwegian collaborators, led by Vidkun Quisling; from September 25 to 27 his Norwegian Nazi party Nasjonal Samling ('National Unity') held its 8th national convention in Oslo, Norway.
German submarine U-253 sank in the Atlantic Ocean northwest of Iceland, probably lost to a British naval mine.
The aviation-themed action film Desperate Journey starring Errol Flynn and Ronald Reagan was released.

September 26, 1942 (Saturday)
The Manhattan Project was granted approval by the War Production Board to use the highest level of emergency procurement priority.
The British destroyer Veteran was torpedoed and sunk in the Atlantic Ocean by German submarine U-404.
German submarine U-417 was commissioned. 
Died: Kenneth D. Bailey, 31, U.S. Marine Corps officer (killed in action at Guadalcanal)

September 27, 1942 (Sunday)
The first Actions along the Matanikau ended in Japanese victory.
The American Liberty ship Stephen Hopkins and the German auxiliary cruiser Stier shelled and sank each other in the South Atlantic Ocean.
German submarine U-165 was depth charged and sunk in the Bay of Biscay by a Vickers Wellington aircraft of No. 311 Squadron RAF.
The St. Louis Cardinals clinched the National League pennant by defeating the Chicago Cubs 9–2 in the first game of a doubleheader.
Charlie Gehringer of the Detroit Tigers played in his final major league game, going 0-for-1 in a pinch hitting appearance against the Cleveland Indians.
Died: Douglas Albert Munro, 22, Canadian-born member of the United States Coast Guard and posthumous recipient of the Medal of Honor (killed at Guadalcanal)

September 28, 1942 (Monday)
German forces started a new offensive in the Battle of Stalingrad, but made little progress.
Joseph Stalin signed an instruction ordering the resumption of the Soviet nuclear research program which had been dormant for a year.
Born: Marshall Bell, actor, in Tulsa, Oklahoma

September 29, 1942 (Tuesday)
British forces began Operation Braganza with the objective of capturing an area of ground near Deir el Munassib in Egypt.
The second of the two Lookout Air Raids took place, but damage was again negligible.
Born: 
Madeline Kahn, actress, comedian and singer, in Boston, Massachusetts (d. 1999); 
Ian McShane, actor, director and producer, in Blackburn, Lancashire, England;
Jean-Luc Ponty, violinist and jazz composer, in Avranches, France
Died: 
Matangini Hazra, 71, Indian revolutionary (shot by British Indian police)

September 30, 1942 (Wednesday)
Operation Braganza was called off, having failed with 260 men killed.
Hitler gave a speech in the Berlin Sportpalast informing his audience that "it will not be the Aryan peoples, but rather Jewry, that will be exterminated."
Germany and Turkey signed a trade agreement.
German submarine U-529 was commissioned. 
Born: Frankie Lymon, rock and roll and R&B singer and songwriter, in Harlem, New York (d. 1968)
Died: Hans-Joachim Marseille, 22, German fighter ace (plane crash)

References

1942
1942-09
1942-09